TV3 News @ 7 was the second early evening news programme on the Irish television network TV3. It was produced by the TV3 News division.

The TV3 News @ 7, presented by main newscasters Alan Cantwell and Colette Fitzpatrick, was a thirty-minute news programme covering Irish national and international news stories, broadcast at 7:00pm from Monday to Friday.

History
When TV3 launched on 20 September 1998 its early evening news programme was called TV3 News @ 6.  It provided a comprehensive view of the day's main international and national news stories, was presented by Alan Cantwell and Gráinne Seoige and was in direct competition with RTÉ News: Six One.  This period of direct rivalry with RTÉ only lasted for a year as TV3 decided to break up the hour-long programme.  As a result of this two new programmes - First Edition at 5:30pm and TV3 News @ 7 - were launched.  Both programmes were still fronted by Cantwell and Seoige, while First Edition became Ireland's first early evening news programme.

In January 2001 the TV3 News @ 7 was dropped and the TV3 News at 6.30 was launched with Cantwell and Seoige still remaining at the helm.

Newscasters

Main newscaster

References

Irish television news shows
Virgin Media Television (Ireland) original programming